IX Equilibrium is the third studio album by the black metal band Emperor. It was released on March 15, 1999 in Europe and on April 27th, 1999 in US through Candlelight Records.

Reception

Eduardo Rivadavia of AllMusic describes the album as a "sonic onslaught of nearly impenetrable proportions". He noted that drummer Trym "doesn't so much keep time as pummel his kit incessantly", while guitarists Ihsahn and Samoth "contribute an equally oppressive wall of sound laced with keyboard textures so demonic they were seemingly concocted by the great horned one himself." He concluded, "Far from a masterpiece, but hardly a stinker either, IX Equilibrium falls quite short of the group's earlier albums through sheer lack of diversity, and will prove indigestible to all but the most committed black metal fans."

In 2021, it was named one of the 20 best metal albums of 1999 by Metal Hammer magazine.

Track listing

Credits

Emperor
Ihsahn – vocals, lead guitars, synth, and bass guitar
Samoth – rhythm guitars
Trym – drums, percussion

Additional personnel
Christophe Szpajdel – logo

References

Emperor (band) albums
1999 albums